Rob Robinson (born September 25, 1977) is an American football coach and former player. He is formerly the head football coach at Northeastern State University in Tahlequah, Oklahoma. Robinson was announced as the new head coach on December 19, 2013, replacing Kenny Evans . Before becoming head coach at Northeastern State, Robinson was an assistant coach and offensive coordinator at Washburn. It was announced in October 2018, that his contract would not be renewed. Robinson resigned on October 31, 2018, with only two season games left.

Playing career
Robinson was a four-year letterman and three-year starter playing as a fullback at William Jewell College. In both 1997 and 1998, Robinson was the Special Teams Player of the Year, was an all-conference selection his junior year, and was named to the Player's Leadership Committee and All-Heart of America Athletic Conference Third Team as a senior.

Personal life
Robinson and his wife, Jess, have two sons beckett and tabor and one daughter grier.

Head coaching record

References

1977 births
Living people
American football fullbacks
Northeastern State RiverHawks football coaches
Washburn Ichabods football coaches
William Jewell Cardinals football players
People from Trenton, Missouri